Night of the Big Heat is a science fiction novel written in 1959 by John Lymington. It tells the story of an unnamed British island that is experiencing a bizarre and stifling heatwave.

Plot summary
The main characters are a former novelist named Richard Callum and his wife Frankie, who own a pub called the White Lion. Richard has hired a secretary to help out on his new book, Patricia Wells, who turns out to have an obsession for Callum. A visiting scientist named Harsen reveals, ultimately, that the reason for the extreme heat is that an alien race of spiders are "beaming in" scouts from their home planet via a radio wave ray, which generates intense amounts of heat as a side effect.

The spiders themselves are carnivorous and eat humans, and give off bodily heat intense enough to burn alive any person who gets too close to them. Together with Harsen, Patricia, and science fiction author Vernon Stone, the Callums try to make it to the island's radio station to call for help so that they can thwart the invasion.

Screen adaptations
A television adaptation was broadcast by ITV in the Play of the Week series on 14 June 1960, scripted by Giles Cooper, and directed by Cyril Coke. It starred Lee Montague as Richard Callum, Sally Bazely as Frankie Callum, Melissa Stribling as Patricia Wells, Karel Štěpánek  as Doctor Harsen, and Bernard Archard as Sir James Murray. Bernard Cribbins also featured in a small role.  Made by Associated Rediffusion, it no longer exists.

The novel was later adapted into a 1967 film, Night of the Big Heat (also known as Island of the Burning Damned) by Planet Film Productions, starring Christopher Lee, Peter Cushing, Patrick Allen, Sarah Lawson, Jane Merrow, and Kenneth Cope. It was directed by Terence Fisher.

References

1959 British novels
British science fiction novels
1959 science fiction novels
Novels about writers
Alien invasions in novels
Novels about extraterrestrial life
Novels set on islands
British novels adapted into films
Hodder & Stoughton books